Andrew Thomas Crummy  (born 14 November 1959) is a Scottish artist, who has designed several major works such as the Great Tapestry of Scotland (2013).

Early life and education
Crummy was born in Craigmillar, Edinburgh, where his mother Helen Crummy was a community activist and founder of the Craigmillar Festival Society. He attended Portobello High School and then gained a B.A. (Hons) in Illustration and Printmaking, at Duncan of Jordanstone College of Art (1983) and an M.A. in Design at Glasgow School of Art (1984). He attributes his artistic nature to his culturally rich childhood, and his immersion in the community arts scene and the Craigmillar Festival. His work includes tapestry, murals, illustration, sculpture and painting.

Major works and art style
Tapestry of Renfrewshire
Prestonpans Tapestry (2010)
Great Tapestry of Scotland (2013)
Scottish Diaspora Tapestry (2014)
Gordon Highlanders WW1 Tapestry (2015)
Mount Felix Tapestry (2017)
Declaration of Arbroath Tapestry (2020)

Honours
Crummy was appointed Member of the Order of the British Empire (MBE) in the 2023 New Year Honours for services to art and to cultural heritage in Scotland.

References

External links

1959 births
Living people
Alumni of the University of Dundee
Alumni of the Glasgow School of Art
Artists from Edinburgh
British textile artists
20th-century Scottish male artists
21st-century Scottish male artists
British embroiderers
Members of the Order of the British Empire